The M-13 motorway, or the Kharian-Rawalpindi motorway, is a motorway in Pakistan, under construction since September 2022. M-13 will connect Rawalpindi to Kharian. The motorway will reduce the travel time between the capital cities of Islamabad and Lahore by one hour compared to the existing M2 Motorway, while also taking traffic off of the congested N5 Highway that runs parallel to it. It is link to M2 Motorway via Rawalpindi Ring Road.

References

External links
 National Highway Authority
 Pakistan National Highways & Motorway Police

M13